Hold Time is the sixth proper studio album from M. Ward, released on February 17, 2009. Hold Time is the follow-up to his 2006 album Post-War and its companion EP To Go Home in 2007.

Hold Time includes guest performances by Jason Lytle of the band Grandaddy, Lucinda Williams, Tom Hagerman of DeVotchKa, and She & Him co-contributor Zooey Deschanel. The album includes a cover of the Buddy Holly song "Rave On". A streaming preview was made available through NPR before the album's release. M. Ward also made an appearance on the Late Show with David Letterman on February 17, 2009.

Track listing
 "For Beginners" – 2:47
 "Never Had Nobody Like You" (Featuring Zooey Deschanel) – 2:26
 "Jailbird" – 2:31
 "Hold Time" – 3:05
 "Rave On" (Featuring Zooey Deschanel) (Norman Petty, Bill Tilghman, Sonny West) – 3:35
 "To Save Me" (Featuring Jason Lytle)– 3:01
 "One Hundred Million Years" – 2:11
 "Stars of Leo" – 3:18
 "Fisher of Men" – 3:12
 "Oh Lonesome Me" (Featuring Lucinda Williams) (Don Gibson) – 6:05
 "Epistemology" – 3:49
 "Blake's View" – 2:29
 "Shangri-La" – 2:20
 "Outro (AKA: I'm a Fool to Want You)" (Joel Herron, Frank Sinatra, Jack Wolf) – 3:47

Personnel
 M. Ward – voice, guitar, keyboards, bass, string arrangements
 Mike Coykendall – bass, percussion
 Adam Selzer, Jordan Hudson, Rachel Blumberg, Than Luu – percussion
 Peter Broderick, Tom Hagerman – strings, violins
 Bill Ritchie – upright bass
 Mike Mogis – percussion, bells, mandolin, keyboards
 Dave Campbell – cello
 Allison Stewart – viola
 Elin Palmer – violin
 Zooey Deschanel – vocals on "Never Had Nobody Like You" and "Rave On"
 Jason Lytle – vocals, keyboards, and guitar on "To Save Me"
 Lucinda Williams – vocals on "Oh Lonesome Me"

Charts

References

2009 albums
M. Ward albums
4AD albums
Merge Records albums